The 1916 Middle Tennessee State Normal football team represented the Middle Tennessee State Normal School (now known as Middle Tennessee State University) during the 1916 college football season. The team captain was Cass Miles.

Schedule

References

Middle Tennessee Normal School
Middle Tennessee Blue Raiders football seasons
Middle Tennessee Normal School football